Grant Golden may refer to:
 Grant Golden (tennis)
 Grant Golden (basketball)